Mohammad Aliabad (also Romanized as Moḩammad ‘Alīābād) is a village in Yusefvand Rural District, in the Central District of Selseleh County, Lorestan Province, Iran. At the 2006 census, its population was 220, in 47 families.

References 

Towns and villages in Selseleh County